Slovak University of Technology in Bratislava (STU) is the biggest and oldest university of technology in Slovakia. In the 2012 Academic Ranking of World Universities it was ranked in the first 150 in Computer Science, the only university in central Europe in the first 200. However, it lost this position in the two following years.

University structure 
 Faculty of Civil Engineering
 Faculty of Mechanical Engineering
 Faculty of Electrical Engineering and Information Technology
 Faculty of Chemical and Food Technology
 Faculty of Architecture and Design
 Faculty of Materials Science and Technology (in Trnava)
 Faculty of Informatics and Information Technologies
 Institute of Management
 Institute of Engineering Studies

European Alliance for Innovation 
The Slovak University of Technology in Bratislava signed a Memorandum of Understanding with the European Alliance for Innovation on 3 May 2013. The signators were the president of the European Alliance for Innovation, professor Imrich Chlamtac and the rector of the Slovak University of Technology in Bratislava, Robert Redhammer.

The purpose of this cooperation is to help innovation made in the STU to reach the market, as well as create a base of operations for EAI in Central Europe.

See also 
 ESDP-Network

References

External links 
 official web page

 
Educational institutions established in 1937
Education in Bratislava
1937 establishments in Czechoslovakia